The 2021 FIM Bajas World Cup season was the 10th season of the FIM Bajas World Cup, an international rally raid competition for motorbikes, quads and SSV.

Calendar
The calendar for the 2021 season had ten baja-style events originally scheduled, some of the events also being part of 2021 FIA World Cup for Cross-Country Bajas.
Due to the impact of the COVID-19, the Baja do Pinhal has been postponed by the organizers to dates unknown yet.

Regulations
The following classes and categories are included:
Category 1: Bike (Up to 450cc single or twin cylinder, 2T or 4T)
Category 2: Quads (three-wheel vehicles are forbidden)
Category 3: SSV
Class 1: Women
Class 2: Junior
Class 3: Veterans

The FIM will award the World Cup to both riders and manufacturers of the bike category; also to riders only in the quad, and SSV (driver and co-driver) categories, as well as to riders only in the woman, and junior classes. A Trophy is awarded to the winners of the veterans category. Any other category, i.e. “Over 450cc” do not count for any of the FIM Baja World Cups.

Teams and riders

Results

Motorbikes

Quads

SSVs

Championship standings

Riders' championship
 Points for final positions in the first six rounds are awarded as follows:

 Points for final positions in the final round are awarded as follows:

A rider's best two results from the first six rounds, along with their result at the final round, will count for the championship standings.

Motorbikes

Quads

Women

Junior

Veteran

SSVs

Manufacturers' championship
 Points for manufacturers are awarded by the points of the top two riders per manufacturer at each baja being added together:

References

External links
 

FIM Cross-Country Rallies World Championship
Bajas World Cup
Bajas